Running Deer may refer to:

 100 metre running deer, a discontinued ISSF shooting event
 Running Deer (film), a 2013 short narrative film
 Running Deer, Virginia, unincorporated community
 Dave Running Deer (fl. 1922–1923), American football player
 Jack Nason (1899–1977), aka Running Deer, American football player
 Chief Running Deer (disambiguation), a name for a Native American chief

See also
 Running After Deer, 2008 album by Alix Lambert and Travis Dickerson